The 2018–19 Midland Football League season was the 5th in the history of the Midland Football League, a football competition in England. The provisional club allocations for steps 5 and 6 were announced by the FA on 25 May.

Premier Division

The Premier Division featured 15 clubs which competed in the previous season, along with five new clubs:
 Dunkirk, promoted from the East Midlands Counties League
 Ilkeston Town, promoted from Division One
 Romulus, from the Northern Premier League
 Walsall Wood, promoted from Division One
 Wolverhampton Sporting Community, promoted from the West Midlands (Regional) League

League table

Stadia and locations

Division One

Division One featured 16 clubs which competed in the previous season, along with three new clubs:
 NKF Burbage, promoted from Division Two
 Rocester, relegated from the Premier Division
 Stapenhill, transferred from the East Midlands Counties League
Also, Smithswood Firs were initially promoted to this division but dissolved.

League table

Stadia and locations

Division Two 

Division Two featured ten clubs which competed in the division last season, along with six new clubs:

Bolehall Swifts, relegated from Division One 
Coventry Alvis, relegated from Division One 
Lane Head
GNP Sports, promoted from Division Three
Boldmere Sports & Social Falcon, promoted from Division Three
FC Stratford, promoted from Division Three

League table

Division Three

Division Three featured 13 clubs which competed in the division last season, along with 3 new clubs:
AFC Church
Coventry Plumbing, joined from Coventry Alliance
WLV Sport

League table

References

External links
 Midland Football League

2018-19
9